Gold Categorisation is a category within the FIA Drivers' Categorisation. The FIA Drivers' Categorisation is a system created by Fédération Internationale de l'Automobile that lists drivers on the basis of their achievements and performances. This categorization is used in sports car racing championships as FIA World Endurance Championship, WeatherTech SportsCar Championship, European Le Mans Series, etc. It was merged from the FIA WEC and FIA GT3 lists. The initial categorisation is based on the driver's age and their career record.

Requirements for Gold categorisation
Amateur or professional driver who meets at least one of the following criteria:
 Driver who satisfies one Platinum criterion;
 Top-three finisher in the general classification of a secondary international single-seaters series (A1 Grand Prix, GP3 Series/FIA Formula 3 European Championship, Formula Renault V6 Eurocup, Superleague Formula, Eurocup Formula Renault 2.0, Indy Lights);
 Driver has competed in the FIA F2 Championship/GP2 Series, FIA Formula 3 Championship or Super Formula Championship since 2012 and has finished on the podium on three or more occasions in one calendar season;
 Winner of the general classification of a regional or national single-seater series (Formula Three, Formula Renault 2.0, Atlantic Championship until 2009 included, Euro V8 Series);
 Top-three finisher in the general classification of the Porsche Supercup / DTM / BTCC / Super GT / V8 Supercars Championship or won a major national Porsche Carrera Cup;
 Winner of a major GT series (FIA GT Championship, Blancpain GT Series (Pro), FIA GT1 World Championship, FIA GT3 European Championship, ADAC GT Masters, British GT Championship, GT Asia Series etc.) or GT category of a major Sportscar series (Intercontinental Le Mans Cup, European Le Mans Series, American Le Mans Series, etc.) with driver(s) of a lower or the same categorisation, GT4 and LMP3 categories are not included;
 Driver who has raced in major International Series with racing wins, podiums and pole positions;
 is a driver whose average lap time is consistently as fast or faster over the majority of the season than the average lap time of Gold drivers competing in the same event of the season (if this time factor was not taken into account, he would be categorised as Silver);
 is a driver whose performances and achievements, despite not being covered by one of the definitions above, may be considered as Gold by the FIA.
 The driver categorisation of any driver over 50 years old will be reduced by one grade for the season following their 50th birthday;
 The driver categorisation of any driver over 55 will be reduced by two grades for the season following their 55th birthday;

Current drivers
This list is accurate as of 10 November 2021 and includes 193 drivers, who hold the Gold license.

References

External links
FIA DRIVER CATEGORISATION
FIA Reveals First 2015 Global Driver Ratings List

Endurance motor racing
Lists of auto racing people